Summit High School is a high school serving Summit County in the central Rocky Mountains of Colorado, United States. About 1,500 students attend the school from the surrounding mountain towns of Frisco, Dillon, Silverthorne, Breckenridge, Copper Mountain, Keystone and Summit Cove.  Summit Middle School, located in Frisco, is the only feeder school for Summit High School.

The high school is located 75 miles west of Denver, between Breckenridge and Frisco, near the Farmer's Korner housing subdivision.

Timothy Ridder serves as the school's principal and Brittny Acres as the assistant principal.

Summit High offers AP, IB, DP, and college-level courses through Colorado Mountain College.

Notable alumni
Mandy Moore, choreographer

References

External links

Public high schools in Colorado
Schools in Summit County, Colorado
International Baccalaureate schools in Colorado